Heritage High School is a high school in Vancouver, Washington. Built in 1999, it has grown to the 24th largest school in the entirety of the state, at approximately 2,200 students. The school is represented with the colors purple and white, as well as mascot Terry the Timberwolf.

Athletics 
Baseball
League Champions: 2007, 2008
District Champions: 2007
Basketball (Boys)
District Champions: 2009
Cheerleading
State Champions: 2002, 2006, 2007, 2008, 2009, 2010 (Grand Champions)
USA National Champions: 2009
Cross Country (Boys)
League Champions: 2001, 2003, 2005, 2006,2007
District Champions: 2003, 2005, 2006, 2007
State Meet appearances: 2002, 2003, 2005, 2006, 2015
Cross Country (Girls)
League Champions: 2003, 2004, 2005
District Champions: 2002, 2004
State Meet appearances: 2002,2004
Dance Team
State Champions: 2007, 2008, 2009
PacWest National Champions: 2009
Football
League Champions: 2001, 2008
Golf (Boys)
League Champions: 2000, 2005, 2007
District Champions: 2007
Gymnastics
League Champions: 2002
District Champions: 2001, 2002
Boys Soccer
League Champions: 2004
Soccer (Girls)
District Champions: 2007
Softball
League Champions: 2002
District Champions: 2001
Tennis (Boys)
District Champions: 2005
Track (Boys)
State Track Champions: 2008
League Champions: 2002, 2003, 2004
District Champions: 2002, 2003
Track (Girls)
League Champions: 2001, 2002, 2003, 2004, 2007
District Champions: 2002, 2003, 2004, 2007
Volleyball
League Champions: 2003, 2004
District Champions: 2003, 2004, 2006
Wrestling
State Champions: 2003
League Champions: 2000, 2001, 2002, 2003,2004, 2006, 2007, 2008
District Champions: 2000, 2001, 2002, 2003, 2004, 2006, 2007

Controversies

Gang-related shooting 
On February 18, 2022, a teenager was shot off campus just two blocks south of the high school. This thrusted the school into a lockout situation which lasted 40 minutes. The principal, Derek Garrison, later stated that the lockout was just a precaution and the students on the campus were safe and out of danger. According to deputies who arrived on the scene, a large crowd of 20-30 Heritage students surrounded the injured individual. The teenager was taken to the hospital and treated for a gunshot wound to the arm. The cause of the shooting was later determined to be from an ongoing war between rival gang members.

Knife fight 
On February 25, 2022, Xavier Echevarria (a student of Mountain View High School (Washington)), came to Heritage High School. He was driven there by a student who attended Heritage. Echevarria went to the school to fight over an alleged accusation made by another student. During the fight, Echevarria pulled out a knife, 6 inches and hooked, and accidentally cut himself in the left arm. A student involved in the fight had been sliced in the left side. Another student also sustained a minor injury in the fight, but this was found to be unrelated to the knife. The injuries were all non-life-threatening. The police were called shortly after the dispute and Echevarria was transported to a local hospital. His laceration required 16 stitches. The incident was originally believed to related to the gang violence around the school just a week before, but the Clark County Sheriff's Department (Washington) found no evidence of any connection. Echevarria was later brought to court on suspicion of first degree assault and possessing a dangerous weapon on a school campus. Echevarria was held at juvenile detention with a bail set at $20,000, and his court date was on March 11, 2022.

Shooting threats 
On December 13, 2022, Jesse Stowell arrived at the high school and made several threats to bring weapons onto the campus and begin shooting people. Stowell was a former student and had made the threats against people who had been involved in a fight with Stowell's younger sister. Stowell was later arrested off campus after an unnamed staff member followed him. He was detained for trespassing. After an investigation, he was arrested for first degree assault, making  threats to bomb or harm any school, and first degree trespassing.

References

External links

GSHL Football – Heritage High School
Heritage Band Website
Columbian newspaper

High schools in Vancouver, Washington
Public high schools in Washington (state)
Educational institutions established in 1999
1999 establishments in Washington (state)